The 2017 British Superbike Championship season was the 30th British Superbike Championship season. It began at Donington on 31 March and ended at the Brands Hatch GP circuit on 15 October. Shane Byrne started the season as the defending Champion, having secured his fifth overall title in the British Superbike Championship

Teams and riders

All entries used Pirelli tyres.

Race calendar and results

Championship standings

Riders' championship
Scoring system
Points were awarded to the top fifteen finishers. A rider had to finish the race to earn points.

Manufacturers' championship

External links

British Superbike Championship
Superbike Championship
British
British Superbike Championship